= Ajish =

Ajish (Ajeesh) is a common first name in Malayalam, the regional language of the state of Kerala in India. It is most commonly used by Hindus and Christians.

In Malayalam, the name means, "Not defeated by any one". In Hindi, 'Ajish' is another name for Shiva.

The name is derived from Sanskrit - a combination of (a)ja (unborn) and ish (Lord) to form 'Lord of the unborn'. Here, unborn refers to beings like angels that are not born; they are created into the universe in the same sense as humans.
